Foued Kahlaoui (born May 25, 1986 in Ajaccio) is a French-born Tunisian professional football player. Currently, he plays in the Championnat de France amateur for Louhans-Cuiseaux. He also holds French citizenship.

He played on the professional level in Ligue 2 for SC Bastia.

External links
Profile at Corse Football

1986 births
Living people
Tunisian footballers
Ligue 2 players
SC Bastia players
Gazélec Ajaccio players
USL Dunkerque players
Association football midfielders
Footballers from Corsica
French footballers